German submarine U-332 was a Type VIIC U-boat of Nazi Germany's Kriegsmarine during World War II. She saw service in the Atlantic Ocean and Mediterranean Sea. Built in 1941 and 1942 at Nordsee-Werke, Emden, U-332 was a Type VIIC U-boat, capable of lengthy ocean patrols and of operating in distant environments.

Design
German Type VIIC submarines were preceded by the shorter Type VIIB submarines. U-332 had a displacement of  when at the surface and  while submerged. She had two shafts and two  propellers.

U-332 was fitted with five  torpedo tubes (four fitted at the bow and one at the stern), fourteen torpedoes, one  SK C/35 naval gun, 220 rounds, and a  C/30 anti-aircraft gun. The boat had a complement of between forty-four and sixty.

Service history
U-332 was launched on 22 March 1941 and commissioned 7 June 1941.

Fate
All 45 crew members died in the event.

Wolfpacks
U-332 took part in eight wolfpacks, namely:
 Störtebecker (17 – 19 November 1941) 
 Benecke (19 November – 2 December 1941) 
 Hartherz (3 – 7 February 1943) 
 Ritter (11 – 23 February 1943) 
 Sturmbock (23 – 26 February 1943) 
 Burggraf (2 – 5 March 1943) 
 Westmark (6 – 11 March 1943) 
 Drossel (29 April 1943)

Summary of raiding history

References

Bibliography

External links

German Type VIIC submarines
World War II submarines of Germany
Ships built in Emden
1941 ships
U-boats commissioned in 1941
U-boats sunk in 1943
U-boats sunk by British aircraft
Ships lost with all hands
World War II shipwrecks in the Atlantic Ocean
Maritime incidents in April 1943